The Hong Kong Junta was an organization formed as a revolutionary government in exile by Filipino revolutionaries after the signing of the Pact of Biak-na-Bato on December 15, 1897. It was headed by Emilio Aguinaldo and included high-level figures in the Philippine revolution against Spanish rule who accompanied Aguinaldo into exile in the Crown Colony of Hong Kong from the Philippines.

Establishment
Filipinos with anti-Spanish sympathies had fled to Hong Kong since the 1872 Cavite mutiny as British law protected political refugees.

The pact of Biak-na-Bato was signed on December 15, 1897. As part of this pact, Emilio Aguinaldo, then leader of the Philippine Revolution, agreed to leave the Philippines. On December 27, 1897, Aguinaldo and a number of ranking revolutionary officers boarded the steamship Uranus at Sual, Pangasinan on Lingayen Gulf.} On January 2, 1898, the first banking day after arrival in Hong Kong, Aguinaldo deposited $MXN400,000 which had been received from the Spanish government under the terms of the concluded Pact, into an account with the Hong Kong and Shanghai Bank under the name Aguinaldo and Company; further routine banking transactions followed. Aguinaldo established a strict budget for the exiles in Hong Kong and enforced a frugal existence.

Financial turmoil and the repudiation of the pact 

Revolutionaries left behind in the Philippines were dissatisfied with the arrangement which had exiles in Hong Kong enjoying funds made available in the Pact while they were left behind with no money, and negotiated an arrangement with the Spaniards for the second installment of those funds, amounting to another $MXN400,000, to be paid to them for distribution to needy insurgents in the Philippines. This was done, and the funds divided among insurgent leaders left behind in Biak-na-Bato. Pedro Paterno, who had been instrumental in negotiating the Pact, informed Aguinaldo of this once it had been done.

Aguinaldo called a meeting and revealed information which he had received from Paterno and Miguel Primo de Rivera, nephew of the Spanish Governor General in the Philippines, that the Spanish would not provide additional funds "so long as there was any revolt in the Philippines and the society of the Katipunan was not dissolved ...". He then announced that Isabelo Artacho, who had been left behind in Biak-na-Bato as director of commerce, was resigning and demanding reimbursement of expenses. This had the effect of uniting the exiles to repudiate the Pact and renew the revolution, and they replaced the officials of the provisional government formed at Biak-na-Bato with members of the exiled group. The exiles voted to approve Aratcho's resignation but to deny him reimbursement. Artacho, having journeyed from the Philippines, arrived in Hong Kong and filed suit against Aguinaldo and Company. This resulted in the issuance of an injunction "to restrain the defendant [Aguinaldo] and each of them from dealing with or parting with the possession...$400,000, or any part thereof." Aguinaldo viewed this as preposterous and suspected that Aratcho had been put up to this by the Spanish Captain General in the Philippines in order to tie their funds up in litigation. After discussing the situation with Filipe Agoncillo and leaving some signed checks with Vito Belarmino, whom he named as his surrogate, Aguinaldo withdrew $MXN50,000 and, using assumed names, secretly left Hong Kong for Singapore along with his secretary and his aide, Colonel Gregorio del Pilar and an aide, Lieutenant J. Leyba.

American involvement in the Philippines 
The United States Asiatic Squadron, commanded by George Dewey, had arrived in Hong Kong on 17 February 1898, having been ordered there by Theodore Roosevelt, who was then Assistant Secretary of the Navy. They were directed to prepare for war with Spain.

In Singapore, a businessman who had lived in the Philippines, Howard. W. Bray, sought out Aguinaldo and facilitated a meeting with meeting with U.S. Consul E. Spencer Pratt. In the meeting, conducted late at night in a public house with Bray and Leyba acting as interpreters, Pratt informed Aguinaldo that the U.S. was now at war with Spain, inquired about the revolution, and opined, "As long as the Spanish have failed to fulfill their obligations under the Treaty of Biaknabato, you have the right to resume the revolution." and "Now is the time for you to strike. Ally yourselves with America and you will surely defeat the Spanish." Aguinaldo wrote retrospectively in 1957, "It is possible more than probable that in their transmission through our interpreters, the American Ideas and mine not only suffered curtailments but also acquired elaboration."

Aguinaldo returned to Hong Kong. The Junta had presumed initially that the Spanish–American War, begun in April, would be confined to the Atlantic Ocean, and that this squadron would intercept Spanish reinforcements which were sent to the Philippines. While Aguinaldo was in Singapore, the Junta had been negotiating terms for reconciliation with representatives of Spain in Hong Kong but, with Spain focused on war with the United States, these negotiations came to nothing. On 25 April, the United States squadron had received orders to proceed to the Philippines. Aguinaldo and his entourage arrived back in Hong Kong under assumed names on 1 May. Aguinaldo was expecting, based on his discussions in Singapore, that the Americans would provide transport for him to return to the Philippines. This was discussed in Junta meetings where Aguinaldo was re-designated as Junta president and it was decided that he should return. The USS McCulloch transported Aguinaldo with thirteen Junta members on a subsequent 17 May voyage, arriving in Cavite two days later.

Writing retrospectively in 1899, Aguinaldo claimed that an American naval officer had urged him to return to the Philippines to fight the Spanish and said "The United States is a great and rich nation and needs no colonies." Aguinaldo also wrote that after checking with Dewey by telegraph, U.S. Consul E. Spencer Pratt had assured him in Singapore: 

On April 28 Pratt wrote to United States Secretary of State William R. Day, explaining the details of his meeting with Aguinaldo: 
There was no mention in the cablegrams between Pratt and Dewey of independence or indeed of any conditions on which Aguinaldo was to cooperate, these details being left for future arrangement with Dewey. Pratt had intended to facilitate the occupation and administration of the Philippines, and also to prevent a possible conflict of action. In a communication written on July 28, Pratt made the following statement: 
On June 16, Secretary Day cabled Consul Pratt: "Avoid unauthorized negotiations with the Philippine insurgents," and later on the same day: 

Filipino scholar Maximo Kalaw wrote in 1927: "A few of the principal facts, however, seem quite clear. Aguinaldo was not made to understand that, in consideration of Filipino cooperation, the United States would extend its sovereignty over the Islands, and thus in place of the old Spanish master a new one would step in. The truth was that nobody at the time ever thought that the end of the war would result in the retention of the Philippines by the United States."

Aguinaldo in the Philippines 

After arriving in the Philippines, Aguinaldo immediately announced his intention to establish a dictatorial government with himself as dictator, saying that he would resign in favour of a duly elected president. In the Battle of Alapan on 28 May 1898, Aguinaldo raided the last remaining stronghold of the Spanish Empire in Cavite with fresh reinforcements of about 12,000 troops. This battle eventually liberated Cavite from Spanish colonial control and led to the first raising of the modern flag of the Philippines in victory. Soon after, Imus and Bacoor in Cavite, Parañaque and Las Piñas in Morong, Macabebe, and San Fernando in Pampanga, as well as Laguna, Batangas, Bulacan, Nueva Ecija, Bataan, Tayabas (present-day Quezon), and the Camarines provinces, were liberated by the Filipinos. They were also able to capture the port of Dalahican in Cavite.

On 12 June 1898, Aguinaldo proclaimed the independence of the Philippines at his house in Cavite El Viejo. Ambrosio Rianzares Bautista wrote the Philippine Declaration of Independence, and read this document in Spanish that day at Aguinaldo's house. On 18 June, Aguinaldo issued a decree formally establishing his dictatorial government. On 23 June, Aguinaldo issued another decree, this time replacing the dictatorial government with a revolutionary government and naming himself as president.

Further work in Hong Kong and in the Philippines 

After Aguinaldo's departure, a schism developed between junta members close to him, committed to independence, and wealthy and influential early exiles in Hong Kong who desired the annexation of the Philippines by America, or status as a protectorate. Aguinaldo courted the second group, but only in hopes of gaining access to financial aid.

Before departing Hong Kong, Aguinaldo had arranged with Wildman for securing of arms, financing that with MXN$117,000 from the funds on deposit in Hong Kong. According to Aguinaldo, an initial shipment of 2,000 Mauser rifles and 200 000 cartridges was received in the Philippines, but a promised second shipment did not arrived. This may have reflected Wildman's reaction to instructions he had received after reporting an offer of alliance by Felipe Agoncillo in November 1897; at that time, the United States Department of State had instructed him to refuse.

In June, another shipment of arms consisting of 2,000 rifles and 200,000 rounds was delivered to the Philippines at a cost of $MXN80,000 This shipment was brokered by Teodoro Sandiko, who accompanied it to the Philippines. The Junta attempted to arrange procurement of arms from Japan and an order was placed for an initial shipment. Confusion over payment and the breaking out of open hostilities between American and Filipino forces, however, resulted in its cancellation.

Aguinaldo asked Agoncillo on 7 August to go to the United States:

Aguinaldo also asked those remaining in Hong Kong to work towards an alliance with the United States, with a mandate to negotiate away some Spanish island chains but to accept being an American protectorate only as a last resort. They were also instructed to unite the community of Filipinos in Hong Kong behind their cause.

On 13 August 1898, the Spanish surrendered Manila to the Americans. Relations with the Americans quickly became strained. On 30 August, Aguinaldo sent Agoncillo instructions informing him that U.S. Major General Wesley Merritt was leaving Manila to take part in peace negotiations between the United States and Spain in Paris. Agoncillo was to

Galicano Apacible, who had become head of the Junta, recommended bribing news service correspondents to produce favorable stories. An ambitions propaganda campaign for Philippine independence begun by the Junta was well underway by the spring of 1899. One result of this was an article in The Manila Times asking: "Will None of My Gallant Knights Rid Me of This Troublous Priest?", explaining:

United States sovereignty, and war 

On December 10, 1898, representatives of Spain and the United States had signed the Treaty of Paris, ending the Spanish–American War. Article three of this treaty provided for the cession of the Philippines by Spain to the U.S. and payment by the U.S. to Spain of twenty million dollars.

The financial resources of the Juntas were being rapidly depleted with relatively little results. Repeatedly, agents of the Junta were forced to pay bribes to consummate their deals. By mid-December, 1898, the $MXN400,000 acquired by Aguinaldo from the Spaniards had been released by the Hong Kong banks; what was left was guarded carefully. The Junta pleaded for funds, which the Filipino government was unable to provide. Physical and administrative separation Junta members and between the Junta in Hong Kong and Aguinaldo in the Philippines fostered a divergence of ideas and policy. Continuous internal rivalries and personal intrigues wasted much energy.

On January 21, 1899, the First Philippine Republic had been proclaimed with Aguinaldo as president, replacing Aguinaldo's revolutionary government. On June 2, 1899, the First Philippine Republic declared war against the United States, marking the official beginning of the Philippine–American war.

The scope of fighting between American and Filipino forces quickly expanded. On February 5, Aguinaldo sent Judge Florentino Torres, who had been a member of the recent Filipino negotiating commission, as emissary to the American commander, General Elwell Otis, to say that the fighting had begun accidentally and Aguinaldo was willing to end it. Otis responded, in the words of his provost marshal, "the fighting having once begun, must go on to the grim end."  By November, superior U.S. forces had overcome organized resistance, and Filipino forces shifted from set piece battles to guerrilla warfare. Aguinaldo began a forced odyssey that would eventually end with his capture.

Decline of the Junta 

The re-election of McKinley as United States president put an end to Junta hopes for his defeat. News of that, announced by the Junta on November 10, 1900, demoralized insurgent forces in the Philippines. Aguinaldo was captured by United States forces in Palanan, Isabela on  March 23, 1901 and on April 1, he swore allegiance to the United States. The Junta addressed a circular on April 8, to all Filipino commanders in the field informing them of Aguinaldo's capture and of the surrender of other leaders. This was the final demoralizing blow to most of the guerrillas in the field.

By 1903, the Junta had lost cohesiveness in Hong Kong and faded away as an organization. It was briefly reconstituted by Artemio Ricarte as the Katipunan Abuluyan, a society based upon the old Katipunan. Ricarte returned to the Philippines in December 1903 hidden in the hold of the S.S. Yuensang, a Chinese freighter, and attempted to reignite the revolution. He was arrested on April 29, 1904, tried, sentenced to six years' imprisonment. He was banished from the islands in 1910 after refusing the oath of allegiance to the United States.

Notes

References

 
 
 
 
 
 . (English translation by Sulpicio Guevara)
 
 
 
 . onhline free to borrow
  (republished by openlibrary.org)
 
 

1897 in the Philippines
1898 in the Philippines
History of Hong Kong
Philippine Revolution
Spanish–American War
Philippine–American War
1897 in the Spanish Empire
1897 in Hong Kong
1897 establishments in Hong Kong